The  Baltimore Colts season was the 16th season for the team in the National Football League (NFL). Led by sixth-year head coach Don Shula, they finished the regular season with a record of 13 wins and 1 loss, and won the Western Conference's Coastal division.

The previous season, the Colts' record was 11–1–2, tied for the best in the league, but were excluded from the playoffs.

In 1968, Baltimore won the Western Conference playoff game with the Minnesota Vikings and the NFL Championship Game in a shutout of the Cleveland Browns, but then lost to the New York Jets of the American Football League in Super Bowl III. Hall of Fame quarterback Johnny Unitas had been injured during the pre-season, so Earl Morrall led the offense. He would finish the season as the league leader in touchdown passes with 26. Shula decided to bring Unitas back in during the second half of the Super Bowl, to no avail. After the upset, instead of championship rings, luxury watches were given to the team as a consolation prize to commemorate their NFL Championship victory over Cleveland.

NFL draft

Personnel

Staff/Coaches

Roster

Regular season

Schedule

Standings

Post-season 

The team made it to the playoffs as winners of the Coastal division and hosted the Minnesota Vikings of the Central division for the Western Conference title. The Colts took a 21–0 lead and went on to win 24–14. They then traveled to Cleveland to take on the Browns in the NFL Championship Game. Baltimore's only loss of the season came at home to the Browns in October, falling 20–30. In late December, the Colts defense was on top of their game as they shut out the Browns 34–0 to gain their third NFL title. The 1968 Colts were being touted as "the greatest football team in history."

In Super Bowl III, the Colts took on the heavy underdog New York Jets led by quarterback Joe Namath, with the Colts favored by 19 1⁄2 points. Before the game, former NFL star and coach Norm Van Brocklin ridiculed the AFL, saying "This will be Namath's first professional football game."  Three days before the game, Namath was being heckled in Miami and he responded by saying: "We’re going to win Sunday. I guarantee it."  The Jets beat the Colts 16–7 in one of the biggest upsets in American sports history.

Perhaps the biggest effect of the Colts' loss is that the predominant sentiment that the AFL was not strong enough to merge with the NFL was firmly squelched.

Awards
Earl Morrall: AP NFL MVP

Don Shula: AP NFL Coach of the Year

References

See also 
History of the Indianapolis Colts
Indianapolis Colts seasons
Colts-Patriots rivalry

Baltimore Colts
1968
National Football League championship seasons
Baltimore Colts